The Alkupis  is a river of Kėdainiai district municipality, Kaunas County, central Lithuania. It flows for 12.3 kilometres and has a basin area of 41.8 km². It starts in the Lančiūnava-Šventybrastis Forest east to Šventybrastis. The river flows southwards through forests and agriculture lands. It empties into the Nevėžis from the left side in Apytalaukis village.

There were several villages (Peiksva, Marijanka, Melninkai) by the Alkupis once but now only Apytalaukis village is inhabited.

The hydronym Alkupis is a compound noun - the first root derives from Lithuanian alkas, alka ('sacred place, shrine' and 'boggy place') and the second root from the word upė ('river').

References

Rivers of Lithuania
Kėdainiai District Municipality